The Anger Management Tour was a rap and rock music tour, founded and started in the fall of 2000 by Limp Bizkit, Papa Roach and, after the release of The Marshall Mathers LP, Eminem.

The first "Anger Management" outing took place in 2000. In the process of starting the large tour, Eminem wanted to include Nine Inch Nails into the list of artists, but Marilyn Manson joining the tour raised issues between him and Trent Reznor and so decided not ask Reznor to join the tour. Eminem  named the tour, saying "It's the perfect name for a tour like this, because most of the music featured in the tour is about anger, frustration, and the bullshit of our lives and the fans loving every minute of it. It's the blend of hardcore rap, industrial metal, and alternative metal that gives it the anger management feel, literally."

The second tour took place in the summer of 2002. Eminem said "It's basically the same thing that it was the last Anger Management Tour without Limp Bizkit... Papa Roach are still cool though."   During a stop in Milton Keynes, UK, fans grew restless and agitated at the prolonged 'stage changeovers' between artists and threw bottles of liquid (alcohol, water, and urine) at the stage.

The third tour took place in the summer of 2005. 50 Cent missed the tour's first two stops because of a scheduling conflict; he was tied up shooting his film debut. Ludacris filled in on those dates.

Artists

Eminem
D12
Dr. Dre
Snoop Dogg
Obie Trice
Xzibit
Busta Rhymes
50 Cent
Ice Cube
Papa Roach
Stat Quo
G-Unit
Mobb Deep
Dina Rae
M.O.P.
Limp Bizkit
Korn
Marilyn Manson
DMX
 Ras Kass
 LifeHouse
Godsmack
Sinistar
Rob Zombie
Ludacris
Linkin Park
Missy Elliott
Rammstein
Pitbull
The X-Ecutioners
Bionic Jive
Cypress Hill
Lil Jon & The East Side Boyz
Hush
Mase
Akon
Flipsyde

Tour dates
1st edition

USA: Limp Bizkit, Eminem (until 21 November), Papa Roach (until 21 November), Xzibit (until 21 November), DMX (started 24 November), Godsmack (started 24 November), Sinisstar (started 24 November)

Europe 2001: Eminem, Xzibit, OutKast

Europe 2001: Limp Bizkit, Godsmack

2nd edition

USA: Eminem, Papa Roach, Ludacris, Xzibit, The X-Ecutioners and Bionic Jive (until 7 August)

Japan: Eminem, 50 Cent, D12, Obie Trice

Europe: Eminem, 50 Cent, Cypress Hill, Xzibit, D12

3rd edition

Eminem, 50 Cent, Lil Jon & the East Side Boyz, G-Unit, D12, Obie Trice, Stat Quo, Lil Scrappy, Pitbull, Ludacris (replace 50 Cent on first two shows)

Cancellations and rescheduled shows

2013
In December 2012, it was confirmed that Eminem would finally perform at Slane Castle in Ireland on August 17, 2013, 8 years after cancelling the European part of the 2005 tour.

DVD

In 2002 a DVD of the 2001 Anger Management Tour Europe was released and contains backstage footage with D12, Xzibit, Marilyn Manson, and Dido.

All Access Europe was released on June 18, 2002.

Track list

"Hamburg"
"Oslo" 
"Stockholm"
"Amsterdam"
"Brussels"
"Paris"
"Manchester"
"London"

In 2005 a DVD of the 2002 performance in Detroit, Michigan was released and features behind-the-scenes footage as well as Eminem's performance in its entirety and special guests D12 and Obie Trice.

Eminem Presents the Anger Management Tour was released on July 4, 2005.

Track list

 "Square Dance"
 "Business" 
 "White America"
 "Kill You"
 "When the Music Stops" (featuring D12)
 "Pimp Like Me" (featuring D12)
 "Fight Music" (featuring D12)
 "Purple Pills" (featuring D12)
 "Stan"
 "The Way I Am"
 "Soldier"
 "Cleanin' Out My Closet"
 "Forgot About Dre"
 "Drips" (featuring Obie Trice)
 "Superman" (featuring Dina Rae)
 "Drug Ballad" (featuring Dina Rae)
 "Just Don't Give a Fuck"
 "Sing for the Moment"
 "Without Me"
 "My Dad's Gone Crazy"

In 2007 a DVD of the 2005 performance in New York City's Madison Square Garden was released and features Eminem's performance shot by Showcase Network in its entirety, plus special guests D12, Obie Trice, and Stat Quo. In 2009, a BD of the same performance was released. This was the last performance to feature Proof before his death in 2006.

Eminem Live From New York was released on November 13, 2007.

Track list

 "Backstage Pt. 1"
 "Evil Deeds"
 "Mosh"
 "Business"
 "Rain Man"
 "Ass Like That"
 "Puke"
 "Kill You"
 "Like Toy Soldiers"
 "Git' Up" (featuring D12)
 "How Come" (featuring D12)
 "Rockstar" (featuring Bizarre of D12)
 "40 Oz" (featuring D12)
 "My Band" (featuring D12)
 "Backstage Pt. 2"
 "Stan"
 "The Way I Am"
 "Just Don't Give a Fuck"
 "Got Some Teeth" (featuring Obie Trice)
 "Stay 'Bout It" (featuring Obie Trice & Stat Quo)
 "The Setup (You Don't Know)" (featuring Obie Trice)
 "Like Dat" (featuring Stat Quo)
 "Cleanin' Out My Closet"
 "Mockingbird"
 "Just Lose It"
 "Backstage Pt. 3"
 "Lose Yourself" (featuring D12)

References

Rock festivals in the United States
Rock festivals in Canada
Rock festivals in Germany
Rock festivals in Norway
Rock festivals in Sweden
Rock festivals in the Netherlands
Rock festivals in Belgium
Rock festivals in France
Rock festivals in England
Rock festivals in Japan
Rock festivals in Scotland
Rock festivals in Ireland
Rock festivals in the United Kingdom
2000 concert tours
2001 concert tours
2002 concert tours
2003 concert tours
2005 concert tours
Eminem concert tours
Music festivals established in 2000
Hip hop music festivals